Litobrenthia angustipunctata is a moth of the family Choreutidae. It is known from Hunan, China.

The wingspan is 10.5–11.0 mm. The head, thorax and tegula are olive. The forewings are broadly rounded triangular, dark olive with inconspicuous slender whitish transverse fascia at one-fifth length of the wing and a relatively large transversely elongate white discal spot. The distal one-sixth is darkened, diffused with eight small pink-violet metallic spots along the termen. There is a small white spot on the proximal limit of the darkened near half width of the wing. There are small clouds of bluish-metallic scales at the costal one-twentieth, one-fifth, two-fifths and four-fifths. The hindwings are dark, olive grey, with an indistinct whitish spot in proximal part and white submarginal striped and apical stripe-shaped patch with pink-metallic scales. The female differs externally from the male in absence of short cilia on the antennae.

Etymology
The specific name is derived from the Latin prefix angusti (meaning narrow) and punctatus (meaning spot), in reference to the pattern of the forewing.

References

Choreutidae